Chowaniec is a Polish surname. Notable people with the surname include:
 Adam Chowaniec (1950–2015), Canadian engineer, entrepreneur, and educator
 Andrzej Chowaniec (born 1958), Polish ice hockey player
 Stefan Chowaniec (born 1953), Polish ice hockey player

See also
 
 Chovanec, Czech and Slovak surname

Polish-language surnames